Vitaliy Nat (born 12 April 1977) is a retired Ukrainian handball player and current coach of SPR Chrobry Głogów.

He competed at the 2010 European Men's Handball Championship in Austria.

References 

Ukrainian male handball players
Living people
1977 births
ZTR players
RK Zagreb players
Vive Kielce players
Wisła Płock (handball) players
Ukrainian handball coaches
21st-century Ukrainian people